The Central District of Davarzan County is a district (bakhsh) in Davarzan County, Razavi Khorasan province, Iran. At the 2006 census, its population was 12,470, in 3,774 families.  The district has one city: Davarzan. The district has two rural districts (dehestan): Kah Rural District and Mazinan Rural District. The district was created effective 15 May 2012.

References 

Districts of Razavi Khorasan Province
Davarzan County
2012 establishments in Iran